The Kentucky Mountain Holiness Association (KMHA) is a Christian denomination in eastern Kentucky aligned with Holiness Methodist beliefs. The Association was begun in 1925 by Lela G. McConnell, a deaconess in the Methodist Episcopal Church. The Association maintains a Wesleyan-Holiness doctrine with a strong emphasis on sanctification. The association maintains an elementary school, a high school, a four-year Bible college, two radio stations, a district of churches, and a farm. Philip Speas is the current association president.

Although the Kentucky Mountain Holiness Association has 12 member churches, it does not consider itself to be a "denomination," and many of its member churches list themselves as "non-denominational." The Kentucky Mountain Holiness Association joined the National Holiness Association as a member (now known as the Christian Holiness Partnership), though many of its members are present at the Interchurch Holiness Convention as well.

History

The first organization, the Mount Carmel Church and School, was established by Dr. Lela G. McConnell in 1925. The first groundbreaking was on 10 March 1925. The Kentucky Mountain Holiness Association was formally incorporated in February 1931, and the Vancleve Bible School, known as the Kentucky Mountain Bible Institute (later Kentucky Mountain Bible College) was opened in October of the same year. A second grade school was opened in Lee City in 1935. A 100-acre farm was purchased for $4500 on July 3, 1942. The radio station was added by private donations, and went on the air July 23, 1948.

Effect
In 1946, Breathitt County voted to become a dry county. In 1957 a big brewery man visited all business places in Jackson. He asked, "Don't you want to vote again on the liquor issue?" All but two of the businessmen said, "No, our jail is practically empty. Before Local Option, the jail was overflowing most of the time. The brewery man said, "I'll be back later. Can't do anything now."

In May 1951, the judge of a certain county said to Miss McConnell, "The Circuit Court meets twice a year. This is the first time in 132 years that we have not had a murder case on the docket in this county."

One man in Lee County who used to ride horseback through a community to take his "turn of corn" to the mill, told us he often heard cursing, fighting and shooting along the creek. He said, "Now, since you have had two revivals there, all I ever hear is singing, 'Amazing Grace that saved a wretch like me' or 'Jesus, Lover of My soul.' If you had done nothing more than change that community, it is worth all your prayers, tears, and labors.

Member organizations

Schools
Kentucky Mountain Bible College, Vancleve, KY
Mount Carmel Schools, Vancleve, KY

Radio stations
The KMHA operates a Moody-affiliate radio station. It features both local, Southern Gospel programming and DJs, as well as syndicated shows and SRN news.
WMTC-FM 99.9 FM, Vancleve, Kentucky

Churches
Bear Pen Worship Center, Campton, KY
Burning Fork Community Church, Salyersville, KY
Five Mile Community Church, Vancleve, KY
Index Community Church, West Liberty, KY
Lakeview Community Church, Salt Lick, KY
London Community Church, London, KY
Old Time Religion Chapel, Campton, KY
Red River Community Church, Hazel Green, KY
Spencer Fork Community Church, Booneville, KY
Tallega Community Church, Beattyville, KY
Wide Creek Community Church, Lee County, KY
Woodsbend Community Church, West Liberty, KY

Farm
KMHA Farms, Vancleve, KY

References

Holiness denominations
Christian denominations established in the 20th century
1925 establishments in Kentucky
Christian organizations established in 1925